XHUAA-FM is a university radio station on 94.5 FM in Aguascalientes City, Aguascalientes, Mexico, owned by the Autonomous University of Aguascalientes.

History 
The UAA's radio station started out on AM as XEUAA-AM 1520, debuting on January 13, 1978. In 2006, the station moved to FM on 94.5 MHz.

References

Mass media in Aguascalientes City
Radio stations established in 1978
Radio stations in Aguascalientes
University radio stations in Mexico
Spanish-language radio stations